The Battle of Bornholm (1563) was the first naval battle of the Northern Seven Years' War (1563–70).

Battle

The naval engagement took place on 30 May 1563 near Bornholm. A Danish squadron of 10 ships under the command of Jacob Brockenhuus (1521-1577) at anchor near Bornholm, saw a Swedish squadron of 19 ships approaching under the command of Jakob Bagge (1502–1577).  Brockenhuus sent only the three ships; Hercules 81 (flag), Hector 38, and Hjort 46,  toward it to show that they didn't want to fight. However, when firing three shots as a challenge, they managed to hit one of the Swedish ships. Swedish forces promptly surrounded and attacked the Danish ships, capturing all three after a 4-hour fight. The remaining Danish ships remained at anchor.

References

Other Sources 
Sundberg, Ulf (1998) Svenska krig 1521-1814 (Hjalmarson & Högberg) 
Stiles, Andrina (1992)  Sweden and the Baltic, 1523 - 1721 (Hodder & Stoughton)  
Frost, Robert I. (2000)  The Northern Wars, 1558-1721(Longman, Harlow)  
1563 in Denmark
Bornholm
Conflicts in 1563